David Charles Miller Jr. (born July 15, 1942) is an American lawyer and diplomat. He served in the Nixon administration and as the U.S. Ambassador to Tanzania and later Zimbabwe under Ronald Reagan.
Miller also served on the African development foundation board of directors.

Education 
Miller graduated from Harvard College and the University of Michigan Law School.

Nixon administration 
In the Nixon administration, Miller worked as confidential assistant to Attorney General John Mitchell for a year and a half, then was moved to the White House, where he worked with Nixon legal counsel John Dean. Miller in 2003 recalled one of his early interactions with Dean involved a request that Miller "set up a safe house here in Washington for the use of the president," for what was intended to be "a completely covert White House operation." Miller said, "I knew at that point that I was going to have to leave. I just said to myself: 'This is insane.'"

References

1942 births
Living people
People from Cleveland
Ambassadors of the United States to Tanzania
Ambassadors of the United States to Zimbabwe
Ohio Republicans
Harvard College alumni
University of Michigan Law School alumni
20th-century American diplomats